The royal arms of Scotland is the official coat of arms of the King of Scots first adopted in the 12th century, and endures as one of the most recognisable national symbols of Scotland. The  flying of the arms in banner form is considered one of the great privileges of the office of the First Minister of Scotland as its usage is granted by the monarch for the First Minister to use. Today, the Royal Arms are most commonly referred to as the Royal Banner, or more commonly, the Lion Rampant.

With the Union of the Crowns in 1603, James VI inherited the thrones of England and Ireland and thus his arms in Scotland were now quartered with the arms of England (which was itself quartered with France) with an additional quarter for Ireland also added (the arms would continue to alter in later years). Though the kingdoms of England and Scotland would share the same monarch, the distinction in heraldry used in both kingdoms was maintained. When the kingdoms of Scotland and England were united under the Acts of Union 1707 to form the Kingdom of Great Britain, no single arms were created, thereby maintaining the convention that the royal arms used in Scotland would continue to differ from those used elsewhere.

Poetically described as "the ruddy lion ramping in his field of tressured gold", the arms are still widely used today as a symbol of Scotland, and are quartered in the royal coat of arms of the United Kingdom along with the arms of England and Ireland.

Features
The arms feature a red rampant lion with blue tongue and claws situated within a red double border decorated with fleurs-de-lis (known as the royal tressure). The fleurs-de-lis in the royal tressure are traditionally said to represent the "auld alliance" with France, but this is unlikely, as this alliance did not come to exist until 1295, when the royal tressure had been firmly established as part of the arms for many years. It was perhaps added merely to make the arms more distinctive, as the symbol of a rampant lion was already used by several lords and kings.

Atop the shield sits the helm and crest. The helm is full-faced of damasked gold with six bars and features gold mantling lined with ermine. Upon the helm sits the crest, depicting the red lion, forward facing and sitting atop the Crown of Scotland, displaying the Honours of Scotland. (The lion wears the Crown of Scotland and holds both the Sceptre and the Sword of State).

Above the crest is the slogan "", a contraction of "" ( being the Scots language spelling of "defence"). Surrounding the shield is the collar of the Most Ancient and Most Noble Order of the Thistle.

The supporters are two crowned and chained unicorns, the dexter supporting a banner of the arms, (only in this instance is the lion depicted facing away from the lance, whereas when flown correctly the lion should face towards or respect the lance or, in most cases, the flag pole); the sinister supporting the national flag of Scotland. (In the legend The Hunt of the Unicorn, otherwise known as The Unicorn Tapestries displayed at Stirling Castle and New York Metropolitan Museum of Art, the unicorn denotes Jesus Christ: Christ will be called the son of unicorns, for the unicorn is irresistible in might and unsubjected to man. The Hunt of the Unicorn is a love story involving Christ the unicorn, mankind and a maiden. The chained unicorn represents a risen Christ, in the garden of paradise and the chains around the unicorn represent the chains of Christ's love for the maiden and mankind). Throughout the ages the arms passed from monarch to succeeding monarch with only slight variations in detail. In some early examples the crest depicts the lion without a sceptre and holding the sword at an angle in the dexter paw, the sword blade passing behind the crowned head of the lion. Other versions show the unicorn supporters without their crowns, although being considered dangerous beasts they are always chained.

The compartment features a number of thistles, the national flower of Scotland. (Later versions of the arms were to include a blue ribbon over the compartment, upon which in gold lettering appears the motto of the Order of the Thistle).

History

Kingdom of Scotland

A form of these arms was first used by King William the Lion in the 12th century, though no trace of them can be made out on his seal. However, a lion rampant can clearly be made out on the seal of his son, Alexander II. Over the years many writers have claimed them to be much older; even Alexander Nisbet, considered to be one of the more reliable Scottish heralds, claims that a lion was first adopted as a personal symbol by the legendary Fergus, with the royal tressure being added in the reign of Achaius.

Throughout the ages the arms passed from monarch to succeeding monarch with only slight variations in detail. In some early examples the lion holds a sword or wears a crown, and the royal tressure has sometimes been interpreted as an orle or bordure. Many of these relatively minor variations will have resulted from the individual efforts of stonemasons, weavers, artists and sculptors throughout the ages in their attempts to create a facsimile of the arms of the period, as well as mistakes and misinterpretations on the part of foreign heraldic artists.

In the reign of James III, the Scottish Parliament made a curious attempt to get rid of the royal tressure, passing an act stating that "the King, with the advice of the three Estates ordained that in time to come there should be no double tressure about his arms, but that he should bear whole arms of the lion without any more". This state of affairs does not appear to have lasted very long, with James III soon re-instating the royal tressure, first without its top, and then in its original form.

Upon the creation of the Public Register of All Arms and Bearings in Scotland in 1672 Charles II registered the blazon of the achievement of the King of Scots as:

Kingdom of France

When Mary, Queen of Scots married Francis, Dauphin of France, in 1558, Mary's Royal arms of Scotland were impaled with those of the Dauphin, whose arms were themselves quartered with those of Scotland to indicate his status as King consort of Scotland. Following the death of Mary I of England in November 1558, the Scottish queen briefly claimed the English crown and quartered the Scottish arms with the royal arms of England, while the Dauphin added the English arms as an escutcheon to his coat, but this claim was renounced in 1560 and the English arms not used thereafter. When Francis ascended to the throne of the Kingdom of France in 1559 as King Francis II, his arms were altered to indicate his status as King of France, with those of Mary also being altered to reflect her elevated status as Queen consort of France.

Following the death of Francis in 1560, Mary continued to use the arms showing Scotland and France impaled, (with a minor alteration of the arms to reflect her change of status from queen-consort to Queen dowager), until her marriage to Henry, Lord Darnley, in 1565. (Such symbolism was not lost upon Queen Elizabeth I of England, given that the English monarchy had for centuries held a historical claim to the throne of France, symbolised by the arms of France having been quartered with those of England since 1340). Following the marriage to Darnley, the arms of Scotland reverted to the blazon which had preceded the marriage to Francis.

Union of the Crowns

On the death of Queen Elizabeth I of England in 1603, James VI inherited the thrones of England and Ireland. The arms of England were quartered with those of Scotland, and a quarter for Ireland was also added. At this time the King of England also laid claim to the French throne, therefore the arms of the Kingdom of England were themselves already quartered with those of the Kingdom of France. James used a different version of his royal arms in Scotland and this distinction in royal protocol continued post the Acts of Union of 1707. (Today, the Royal Arms of the United Kingdom used in Scotland continue to differ from those used elsewhere).

During the reign of King Charles II, the royal arms used in Scotland were augmented with the inclusion of the Latin motto of the Order of the Thistle, the highest Chivalric order of the Kingdom of Scotland. The motto of the Order of the Thistle, appears on a blue scroll overlying the compartment. (Previously, only the collar of the Order of the Thistle had appeared on the arms).

The addition by King Charles of  ensured that the blazon of his Royal arms used in Scotland complemented that of his Royal arms used elsewhere, in that two mottoes were displayed. The blazon used elsewhere had included the French motto of the arms, together with the Old French motto of the Order of the Garter, the highest Chivalric order of the Kingdom of England. The motto of the Order of the Garter, appears on a representation of the garter surrounding the shield. Henceforth, the versions of the Royal arms used in Scotland and elsewhere were to include both the motto of the arms of the respective kingdom and the motto of the associated order of chivalry.

From the accession of the Stuart dynasty to the throne of the Kingdom of Ireland in 1603, the Royal Arms have featured the harp, or Cláirseach, of Ireland in the third quadrant, the style of the harp itself having been altered several times since. The position of King of Ireland ceased with the passage by the Oireachtas of the Republic of Ireland Act 1948, when the office of President of Ireland (which had been created in late 1937) replaced that of the King of Ireland for external as well as internal affairs. The Act declared that the Irish state could be described as a republic, following which the newly created Republic of Ireland left the British Commonwealth. However, the modern versions of the Royal Arms of the United Kingdom of Great Britain and Northern Ireland used both in Scotland and elsewhere, and also the arms of Canada, continue to feature an Irish harp to represent Northern Ireland.

Changes to the blazon of the arms
 Following the marriage of Mary, Queen of Scots, in 1558, the blazon of the royal arms of Scotland included elements from the arms of:
The Dauphin of France, (1558–1559)
The Kingdom of England, (1558-1560)
The Kingdom of France, (1559–1565)
 Following the Union of the Crowns in 1603, the blazon of the royal arms of Scotland included elements from the arms of:
The Kingdom of France, (1603–1707)
The Kingdom of England, (1603–1707)
The Kingdom of Ireland, (1603–1707)
The House of Orange-Nassau, (1689–1702)
 Following the Acts of Union of 1707, the blazon of the royal arms of Great Britain used in Scotland included elements from the arms of:
The Kingdom of France, (1707–1800)
The Kingdom of Ireland (1707–1800)
The Electorate of Hanover, (1714–1800)
 Following the Act of Union of 1800, the blazon of the royal arms of the United Kingdom used in Scotland included elements from the arms of:
The Electorate of Hanover, (1801–1814)
The Kingdom of Hanover, (1814–1837)
 Following the accession of Queen Victoria in 1837, the modern royal arms of the United Kingdom were adopted.

As a banner

Since the formation of the Kingdom of Great Britain, the Scottish arms are now generally used in combination with the arms of England and Ireland. However, the original royal banner of Scotland, also known as the "Lion Rampant", continues to be used officially in Scotland; being flown from royal residences when the Queen is not in residence and used in an official capacity by the First Minister, Lord High Commissioner to the General Assembly of the Church of Scotland, Lord Lyon King of Arms and lords lieutenant in their lieutenancies. Unofficially, the royal banner is often used as a secondary national flag, being most often seen at sporting events involving Scottish national teams. (Both the Scottish Football Association and Scotland national football team use a logo based upon the royal arms).

Current uses

The royal arms in their current form were adopted on the accession of Queen Victoria in 1837. They show the Scottish arms in the first and fourth quarters of the shield, with the English arms in the second quarter and the Irish in the third. The Scots motto  appears as in the original arms, and the Latin motto of the Order of the Thistle, also appears on a blue scroll overlying the compartment. The Scottish unicorn and English lion hold lances flying the banners of St Andrew and St George, in imitation of the two unicorns in the original arms. The unicorn is placed in the dominant position on the dexter side, and the shield is encircled by the collar of the Order of the Thistle instead of the Garter.

The arms of the Duke of Rothesay quarter the arms of the Great Steward of Scotland, with the arms of the Lord of the Isles. In the centre, on an inescutcheon, are the arms of the heir apparent to the King of Scots, namely the royal arms of Scotland with a three-pointed label.

The coat of arms of the Government of Gibraltar correspond to the British royal arms in that they also feature the Scottish arms in the second quarter of the shield and use the unicorn as the sinister supporter, with the Gibraltar's own coat of arms under the motto Dieu et mon droit.

The royal arms of Canada correspond to the British royal arms in that they also feature the Scottish arms in the second quarter of the shield and use the unicorn as the sinister supporter. The Canadian version also mirrors the Scottish version in that each supporter not only supports the shield but also a lance displaying a flag.

Both the flag and arms of Nova Scotia feature elements of the Scottish arms. However, unlike the royal arms of Canada, those of Nova Scotia portray the unicorn as the royally crowned dexter supporter, in the Scottish style. The shield depicts an inverse representation of the flag of Scotland and features the Royal arms of Scotland on an inescutcheon. The motto  appears above the crest in keeping with the Scottish heraldic style. (Both the flag and shield of the lieutenant governor of Nova Scotia also feature the Scottish arms on an inescutcheon).

The royal tressure appears on the arms of numerous Scottish families and institutions as a mark of royal favour, known in heraldry as an augmentation of honour; prominent examples occur in the arms of the cities of Perth and Aberdeen. In 2002, the Queen granted arms to the Monarchist League of Canada which featured a royal tressure with maple leaves instead of the usual fleurs-de-lis. A royal tressure with roses and thistles can be found in the arms of the Marquis of Aberdeen and Temair.

The arms of the Archdiocese of Mechelen used to be the same as those of Scotland. They were quartered with the arms of the city of Brussels in 1961 when it became the Archdiocese of Mechelen-Brussels. The reason for the use of the Scottish arms is debated. One theory for them being used is that Saint Rumbold, the patron saint of Mechelen, was an Irish monk and in medieval times Irish monks were called Scotii, and thus later the arms of Scotland were taken as arms for the saint. Another theory is that Saint Rumbold was the son of a Scottish King and thus his arms were identical to the Scottish arms.

The coat of arms of the town of Sankt Wendel in Saarland combines elements of the Scottish flag and the Scottish coat of arms. Four lilies, taken from the Scottish royal coat of arms, on a blue background, are reminiscent of Saint Wendelin. Legendary tradition describes him as a Scottish king's son. In 1465, the parish of St. Wendel sent two parishioners to Scotland to research the legend of Saint Wendelin's royal Scottish origins. After allegedly positive confirmation, the Scottish lion coat of arms was used in the seal of the parish of St. Wendel. The blue-silver/white flag of Sankt Wendel takes up the blue background of the coat of arms of the city and the silver/white of its lilies as well as the colors of the Scottish flag.

See also
 Honours of Scotland
 Scottish heraldry
 Court of the Lord Lyon
 Unicorn (coin)

References

External links

 
National coats of arms
National symbols of Scotland
Scottish monarchy
Scotland
Scotland
Scotland
Scotland
Scotland
Scotland
Scotland
Scotland
Scotland
Scotland